Ngonidzashe Chidoma (born ) is a Zimbabwean-born South African rugby union player for the  in the Currie Cup and the Rugby Challenge. His regular position is prop.

References

Zimbabwean rugby union players
Living people
1996 births
Sportspeople from Harare
Rugby union props
Pumas (Currie Cup) players